Cleridae are a family of beetles of the superfamily Cleroidea. They are commonly known as checkered beetles. The family Cleridae has a worldwide distribution, and a variety of habitats and feeding preferences.

Cleridae have many niches and feeding habits. Most genera are predaceous and feed on other beetles and larvae; however other genera are scavengers or pollen feeders. Clerids have elongated bodies with bristly hairs, are usually bright colored, and have variable antennae. Cleridae can be identified based on their 5–5–5 tarsal formula, division of sternites, and the absence of a special type of vesicle. Female Cleridae lay between 28–42 eggs at a time predominately under the bark of trees. Larvae are predaceous and feed vigorously before pupation and subsequently emergence as adults.

Clerids have a minor significance in forensic entomology. Some species are occasionally found on carrion in the later dry stages of decay. Also, some species are pests (stored product entomology) and are found infesting various food products. Research efforts related to Cleridae have focused primarily on using certain species as biological controls. This is a very effective technique for controlling bark beetles due to the voracious appetite of many clerid species.

Description

Appearance
Their entire bodies are covered with bristly hairs and many display an ornate body color pattern. These often brightly color patterns can be red, yellow, orange, or blue. The antennae are clubbed at the tip for most species, but others can be "clubbed, saw-tooth, or thread-like." The pronotum region is nearly cylindrical and characteristically narrower than the elytra (special hardened front wings), while the head is as wide or wider than the pronotum. Their elytra have tiny pits or depressions, and never expose more than two tergites (dorsal plates).

Identification
Clerid beetles fall under the suborder Polyphaga. Key characteristics of Polyphaga are that the hind coxa (base of the leg), do not divide the first and second abdominal/ventral plates which are known as sternites. Also, the notopleural suture (found under the pronotal shield) is not present. To further identify Clerid beetles, a few additional characteristics need to be examined.

Clerid beetles have unique legs that help to distinguish them from other families. Their tarsal formula is 5–5–5, meaning that on each of the front, middle and hind legs there are 5 tarsomeres (individual subsegments of the feet/tarsi). One or more of these subsegments on each leg is typically lobed, and the 4th tarsi is normally difficult to distinguish. Furthermore, an important feature that eliminates many other families of beetles is that clerids' front coxae (base of the leg) expose the second segment of the legs known as the trochanter.

The second defining characteristic of the family Cleridae is that clerids never have eversible vesicles (small usually hidden balloon-like structures thought to be scent glands) on their abdomen and pronotum. This characteristic distinguishes them from a similar family Melyridae which sometimes has these glands. This trait is very important in correctly differentiating checkered beetles from Melyridae.

Distribution and ecology

Cleridae can be found in the Americas, Africa, Europe, the Middle East and even in Australia. There are approximately 3,500 species in the world and about 500 species in North America. Due to this wide distribution there are many different habitats in which the checkered beetles can be found.

Many of the species are known as "flower visitors", that prey on other flower visiting insects and also feed on pollen. These species are found in moist, sunny environments where flowering plants are found in abundance.

Another habitat commonly inhabited by clerid beetles is trees. These "tree living species" are found in forests across the world with various climates and an array of easily preyed upon insects. They seek protection under the bark and hunt for other insects above and below the bark. The primary source of prey for these bark living hunters is bark beetles.

The third type of clerid beetles is the "nest robbing species" which live in shrubbery and in trees. Unlike the tree living species these species do not actually burrow into the bark. Nest robbing species typically hunt termite, bee, and wasp larvae, and one particular species has been noted to prey primarily on grasshopper egg masses. Not all nest robbing species actively hunt live prey, some species for example prefer to feed only on dead honey bee larvae and adults.

Feeding habits
The Cleridae contains many species of predaceous beetles that feed on other beetles and beetle larvae in their natural habitat. The most common prey item for checkered beetles are the bark beetles and wood boring beetles.

In general, the bulk of adult Cleridae feed mainly on other adult beetles while the larvae stage feed on other beetle larvae. Some checkered beetles are known to have an extremely voracious appetite with some larvae able to consume "several times their own body weight" in a day.

Although most species of checkered beetles are predaceous in nature, some are scavengers and others have been found feeding on flower pollen. Because of the checkered beetles predaceous nature and insatiable appetite, they are often key players in the biological control of other insects. The checkered beetles have also developed a unique adaptation to aid in their quest for prey. The beetles use pheromones to help them locate, kill, and consume their prey.

The diversity of checkered beetle's feeding habits is quite evident when different species are examined. The Necrobia spp. are attracted to dry carrion and other decomposing animal matter such as bones and skin as well as various meat products. Thanasimus spp. are found in woodland areas where bark beetle species constitute their main source of prey. The primary source of prey for the Phyllobaenus spp. are wood borers, immature weevils, and hymenoptera larvae. One of the more diverse genera is Trichodes, the larvae feed on the pollen of flowering plants and adults prey upon grasshoppers and wasps.

Life cycle
The general life cycle of clerids has been known to last anywhere from 35 days to more than 3 years, and is strongly dependent on the life cycle of their prey. While the life cycle can vary in length between genus and species, temperature is also a major determinant in the length of time spent in each stage of development. The warmer the temperature is, the quicker the lifecycle, and the cooler the temperature is the slower the lifecycle. If temperatures dip below a threshold temperature for an extended period of time clerids and most other insects will have growth and developmental progress arrested. Like all beetles, Cleridae follow a holometabolous life cycle: the egg hatches into a larva, which grows and feeds, changing its skin to form a pupa, and the pupa shedding its skin to emerge as an adult. The larvae of the majority of the known species of Cleridae feed upon the eggs and young of wood-boring beetles, while the adults feed on the adult bark beetles.

Copulation takes place while the female feeds, because females need a large amount of food for egg development. The female lays her eggs 36–72 hours after copulation. The eggs are laid in between pieces of bark on wood-borer-infested trees or under stones in the soil. She may lay 28–42 eggs at a time. For the longer lifespaned species such as Thanasimus this occurs in late summer or early fall to give the larvae enough time for proper growth before having to overwinter.

When larvae hatch from their eggs, they are either red or yellow. Their bodies have a slender and flat appearance with short legs due to their minimal movement. The larvae are covered in hair and have two horn-type projections on the dorsal area of the last body segment. Immediately after birth, they start searching for food close to where they hatched. They feed on wood-borer insects on trees, or feed on their species' substrate or prey of choice. Feeding is the main purpose of the larval stage to prepare for pupation. Once their larval stage is complete the tree dwelling species make their way to the bottom of the tree to pupate. The pupal stage can last from 6 weeks to one year depending on the need to overwinter, and how short the overall lifecycle is for a particular species. A majority of clerid species pupate in earthen cells which are made from soil and certain enzymes secreted from their mouths. The rest remain in pupal cells. Adult beetles emerge from pupation and spend a variable time of their life maturing, and eventually oviposit. Sexually mature adults or imagos of Thanasiumus overwinter inside the wood-borer-infested trees and oviposit during the spring.

Forensic relevance

Stored product entomology
Necrobia rufipes, commonly known as the red-legged ham beetle, is of particular importance in stored product entomology. N. rufipes infests dried or smoked meats, especially those products that are stored unwrapped for long periods of time. Adults feed on the surface of the products, while the larvae damage the meat by boring down usually in the fatty parts. N. rufipes has been recorded to have fed upon a large variety of items ranging from hides and dried figs to Egyptian mummies. In addition, products such as wool and silk can become infested, but not destroyed.

Medico-legal entomology
Since clerids are predaceous in nature, they have been found feeding on fly larvae as well as the skin and bones of carrion. Most clerids are not useful in forensics because of their food choice, but some species such as Necrobia rufipes can be useful. Necrobia rufipes is attracted towards carrion in the later stages of decomposition, so its arrival on carrion can help provide an estimate for the post-mortem interval or PMI. Although the checkered beetle is not the most significant insect on carrion, the beetles predaceous nature and its ability to reproduce in carrion that is exposed to the environment provides some forensic importance.

Ongoing research
There is ongoing research with some clerid species. Forensic research is limited because of their late arrival on carrion, but members such as Thanasimus undatulus have been researched as a possible role in integrated pest management or IPM. Thanasimus undatulus is a predator of bark beetles. Some species of bark beetles such as the southern pine beetle and the mountain pine beetle can become pests to the lumber industry because in large numbers they can cause damage and kill live trees. Thanasimus undatulus has been researched as a possible biological control agent for these pests. Researchers and forestry officials have used bark beetle aggregation pheromones to attract the checkered beetle to specific trees. This causes the bark beetles to be overwhelmed, extensively preyed upon by the clerid beetles, and typically eliminated.
There is also additional research being done pertaining to the impact of clerids on pollination in flowers.

Systematics
The genera of Cleridae are divided among several subfamilies, though some genera still defy easy classification. Several taxonomic schemes exist, recognizing for example a group around Neorthopleura as distinct subfamily Neorthopleurinae, or splitting off the Thaneroclerinae as distinct family, or circumscribing the Korynetinae sensu stricto or sensu lato. The following list of tribes and selected genera is thus preliminary. Some notable species are also listed. The oldest members of the family are Protoclerus and Wangweiella the late Middle Jurassic (Callovian) Daohugou bed in Inner Mongolia, China.

Clerinae
 Allonyx Jacquelin du Val, 1860
 Anthicoclerus Schenkling, 1906
 Aphelochroa Quedenfeldt, 1885
 Apopempsis Schenkling, 1903
 Apteroclerus Wollaston, 1867
 Aptinoclerus Kuwert, 1893
 Aradamicula Sedlacek & Winkler, 1975
 †Arawakis (fossil)
 Astigmus Kuwert, 1894
 Aulicus Spinola, 1841
 Axina Kirby, 1818
 Balcus
 Barriella Opitz, 2003
 Barrotillus Rifkind, 1996
 Blaxima Gorham, 1882
 Bousquetoclerus Menier, 1997
 Burgeoneus Pic, 1950
 Caestron Dupont in Spinola, 1844
 Calendyma Lacordaire, 1857
 Canariclerus Winkler, 1982
 Cardiostichus Quedenfeldt, 1885
 Caridopus Schenkling in Sjöstedt, 1908
 Cleromorpha Gorham, 1876
 Cleropiestus Fairmaire, 1889
 Clerus Fabricius, 1775
 Clytomadius Corporaal, 1949
 Colyphus Spinola, 1841
 Coptoclerus Chapin, 1924
 Cormodes Pascoe, 1860
 Corynommadius Schenkling, 1899
 Ctenaxina Schenkling, 1906
 Ctenoclerus Solervicens, 1997
 Dasyceroclerus Kuwert, 1894
 Dasyteneclines Pic, 1941
 Dieropsis Gahan, 1908
 Dologenitus Opitz, 2009
 Dozocolletus Chevrolat, 1842
 Eburiphora Spinola, 1841
 Eburneoclerus Pic, 1950
 Ekisius Winkler, 1987
 Eleale Newman, 1840
 Enoclerus Gahan, 1910
 Epiclines Chevrolat in Guérin-Ménéville, 1839
 Eunatalis Schenkling, 1909
 Eunatalis porcata
 Erymanthus Spinola, 1841
 Eurymetomorphon Pic, 1950
 Falsomadius Gerstmeier, 2002
 Falsoorthrius Pic, 1940
 Graptoclerus Gorham, 1901
 Gyponyx Gorham, 1883
 Hemitrachys Gorham, 1876
 Homalopilo Schenkling, 1915
 Inhumeroclerus Pic, 1955
 Jenjouristia Fursov, 1936
 Languropilus Pic, 1940
 Lissaulicus C.O.Waterhouse, 1879
 Memorthrius Pic, 1940
 Metademius Schenkling, 1899
 Microclerus Wollaston, 1867
 Micropteroclerus Chapin, 1920
 Microstigmatium Kraatz, 1899
 Mimolesterus Gerstmeier, 1991
 Mitrandiria Kolibac, 1997
 Myrmecomaea Fairmaire, 1886
 Natalis Laporte de Castelnau, 1836
 Neogyponyx Schenkling, 1906
 Neoscrobiger Blackburn, 1900
 Ohanlonella Rifkind, 2008
 Olesterus Spinola, 1841
 Omadius Laporte de Castelnau, 1836
 Oodontophlogistus Elston, 1923
 Operculiphorus Kuwert, 1894
 Opilo Latreille, 1802
 Orthrius Gorham, 1876
 Oxystigmatium Kraatz, 1899
 Phlogistomorpha Hintz, 1908
 Phlogistus Gorham, 1876
 Phloiocopus Spinola, 1841
 Phonius Chevrolat, 1843
 Pieleus Pic, 1940
 Placocerus Klug, 1837
 Placopterus Wolcott, 1910
 Plathanocera Schenkling, 1902
 Platyclerus Spinola, 1841
 Priocera Kirby, 1818
 Priocleromorphus Pic, 1950
 Prioclerus Hintz, 1902
 Pseudolesterus Miyatake, 1968
 Pseudomadius Chapin, 1924
 Pujoliclerus Pic, 1947
 Sallea Chevrolat, 1874
 Scrobiger Spinola, 1841
 Sedlacekius Winkler, 1972
 Sikorius Kuwert, 1893
 Stigmatium Gray in Griffith, 1832
 Systenoderes Spinola, 1841
 Tanocleria Hong, 2002
 Thalerocnemis Lohde, 1900
 Thanasimodes Murray, 1867
 Thanasimus Latreille, 1806
 Thanasimus formicarius – Ant Beetle
 Tillicera Spinola, 1841
 Trichodes Herbst, 1792
 Trichodes alvearius
 Trichodes apiarius
 Trichodes leucopsideus
 Trogodendron Spinola, 1841
 Trogodendron fasciculatum – Yellow-horned Clerid
 Wilsonoclerus
 Winklerius Menier, 1986
 Wittmeridecus Winkler, 1981
 Xenorthrius Gorham, 1892
 Zahradnikius Winkler, 1992
 Zenithicola Spinola, 1841

Enopliinae (sometimes in Korynetinae)
 Antygodera
 Apolopha Spinola, 1841
 Corinthiscus Fairmaire & Germain, 1861
 Cregya LeConte, 1861
 Curacavi
 Enoplium Latreille, 1802
 Exochonotus
 Hublella
 Lasiodera Gray in Griffith, 1832
 Neopylus Solervicens, 1989
 Paracregya
 Pelonium
 Phymatophaea Pascoe, 1876
 Platynoptera Chevrolat, 1834
 Pseudichnea Schenkling, 1900
 Pylus Newman, 1840
 Pyticara Spinola, 1841 (including Pelonides)
 Teneroides Gahan, 1910
 Tenerus Laporte de Castelnau, 1836
 Thriocerodes Wolcott & Dybas, 1947

Epiphloeinae (sometimes in Korynetinae)
 Acanthocollum
 Amboakis
 Decaphloeus
 Decorosa Opitz, 2008
 Diapromeces Opitz, 1997
 Ellipotoma Spinola, 1844
 Epiphloeus Spinola, 1841
 Hapsidopteris Opitz, 1997
 Ichnea Laporte de Castelnau, 1836
 Iontoclerus Opitz, 1997
 Katamyurus Opitz, 1997
 Madoniella Pic, 1935
 Megaphloeus
 Megatrachys Opitz, 1997
 Opitzius Barr, 2006
 Parvochaetus Opitz, 2006
 Pennasolis Opitz, 2008
 Pericales
 Pilosirus Opitz, 1997
 Plocamocera Spinola, 1844
 Pteroferus
 Pyticeroides Kuwert, 1894
 Silveirasia
 Stegnoclava
 Turbophloeus

Hydnocerinae (including Phyllobaeninae)
 Abrosius Fairmaire, 1902
 Achlamys C.O.Waterhouse, 1879
 Allelidea G.R.Waterhouse, 1839
 Blaesiophthalmus Schenkling, 1903
 Brachycallimerus Chapin, 1924
 Brachyptevenus
 Callimerus Gorham, 1876
 Cephaloclerus Kuwert, 1893
 Cucujocallimerus Pic, 1929
 Emmepus Motschulsky, 1845
 Eurymetopum Blanchard, 1842
 Isohydnocera Chapin, 1917
 Isolemidia Gorham, 1877
 Laiomorphus Pic, 1927
 Lasiocallimerus Corporaal, 1939
 Lemidia Spinola, 1841
 Neohydnus Gorham, 1892
 Parmius Sharp, 1877
 Paupris Sharp, 1877
 Phyllobaenus Dejean, 1837
 Silviella Solervicens, 1987
 Solemidia
 Stenocallimerus Corporaal & Pic, 1940
 Theano Laporte de Castelnau, 1836
 Wolcottia Chapin, 1917

Korynetinae
 Chariessa Perty in Spix & Martius, 1830
 Korynetes Herbst, 1792
 Korynetes caeruleus – steely blue beetle
 Lebasiella Spinola, 1844
 Loedelia R.Lucas, 1918
 Necrobia Latreille, 1797
 Necrobia ruficollis – red-shouldered ham beetle
 Necrobia rufipes – red-legged ham beetle
 Neorthopleura Barr, 1976
 Opetiopalpus Spinola, 1844
 Romanaeclerus Winkler, 1960

Tarsosteninae (sometimes in Korynetinae)
 Paratillus Gorham, 1876
 Tarsostenodes Blackburn, 1900
 Tarsostenus Spinola, 1844

Thaneroclerinae (tentatively placed here)
 Cleridopsis Champion, 1913
 Compactoclerus Pic, 1939
 Cyrtinoclerus Chapin, 1924
 Isoclerus Lewis, 1892
 Meprinogenus Kolibáč, 1992
 Neoclerus Lewis, 1892
 Onerunka Kolibáč
 Thaneroclerus Lefebvre, 1838
 Viticlerus
 Zenodosus Wolcott, 1910

Tillinae
 Antenius Fairmaire, 1903
 Arachnoclerus Fairmaire, 1902
 Araeodontia Barr, 1952
 Archalius Fairmaire, 1903
 Aroterus Schenkling, 1906
 Basilewskyus Pic, 1950
 Biflabellotillus Pic, 1949
 Bilbotillus Kolibac, 1997
 Bogcia Barr, 1978
 Bostrichoclerus Van Dyke, 1938
 Callotillus Wolcott, 1911
 Ceratocopus Hintz, 1902
 Chilioclerus Solervicens, 1976
 Cladiscopallenis Pic, 1949
 Cladiscus Chevrolat, 1843
 Cladomorpha Pic, 1949
 Cteniopachys Fairmaire, 1889
 Cylidroctenus Kraatz, 1899
 Cylidrus Latreille, 1825
 Cymatodera Gray in Griffith, 1832
 Cymatoderella Barr, 1962
 Dedana Fairmaire, 1888
 Denops Fischer von Waldheim, 1829
 Diplocladus Fairmaire, 1885
 Diplopherusa Heller, 1921
 Eburneocladiscus Pic, 1955
 Egenocladiscus Corporaal & van der Wiel, 1949
 Elasmocylidrus Corporaal, 1939
 Enoploclerus Hintz, 1902
 Eucymatodera Schenkling, 1899
 Falsopallenis Pic, 1926
 Falsotillus Gerstmeier & Kuff, 1992
 Flabellotilloidea Gerstmeier & Kuff, 1992
 Gastrocentrum Gorham, 1876
 Gracilotillus Pic, 1933
 Impressopallenis Pic, 1953
 Isocymatodera Hintz, 1902
 Lecontella Wolcott & Chapin, 1918
 Leptoclerus Kraatz, 1899
 Liostylus Fairmaire, 1886
 Macroliostylus Pic, 1939
 Magnotillus Pic, 1936
 Melanoclerus Chapin, 1919
 Microtillus Pic, 1950
 Monophylla Spinola, 1841
 Neocallotillus Burke, 2016
 Nodepus Gorham, 1892
 Notocymatodera Schenkling, 1907
 Onychotillus Chapin, 1945
 Orthocladiscus Corporaal & van der Wiel, 1949
 Pallenis Laporte de Castelnau, 1836
 Paracladiscus Miyatake, 1965
 Paradoxocerus Kraatz, 1899
 Paraspinoza Corporaal, 1942
 Philocalus Klug, 1842
 Picoclerus Corporaal, 1936
 †Prospinoza (fossil)
 Pseudachlamys Duvivier, 1892
 Pseudogyponix Pic, 1939
 Pseudopallenis Kuwert, 1893
 Pseudoteloclerus Pic, 1932
 Rhopaloclerus Fairmaire, 1886
 Smudlotillus Kolibac, 1997
 Spinoza Lewis, 1892
 Stenocylidrus Spinola, 1844
 Strotocera Schenkling, 1902
 Synellapotillus Pic, 1939
 Synellapus Fairmaire, 1903
 Teloclerus Schenkling, 1903
 Tilloclerus White, 1849
 Tillodadiscus Pic, 1953
 Tillodenops Hintz, 1905
 Tilloidea Laporte de Castelnau, 1832
 Tillus Olivier, 1790
 Tylotosoma Hintz, 1902

Incertae sedis
 Aphelocerus Kirsch, 1871 (Clerinae? Tillinae?)
 Apteropilo Lea, 1908 (Clerinae? Enopliinae?)
 Cleropiestus Fairmaire, 1889 (Clerinae? Hydnocerinae?)
 Dermestoides Schaeffer, 1771 (Korynetinae s.l.?)
 Evenoclerus Corporaal, 1950 (Clerinae? Hydnocerinae?)
 Muisca Spinola, 1844 (Clerinae? Enopliinae?)
 Parapelonides Barr, 1980 (Korynetinae s.l.?)
 Perilypus Spinola, 1841 (Clerinae? Tillinae?)
 Syriopelta Winkler, 1984 (Korynetinae s.l.?)

References

External links

 Atlas of checkered beetles (Cleridae) of Russia
 Roland Gerstmeier publications on Cleridae
 Cleridae of Atlantic Canada

 
Polyphaga families
Taxa named by Pierre André Latreille